The 1924 Primera División championship the second and last tournament organized by the dissident body Uruguayan Football Federation (FUF).

Overview 
The tournament consisted of a round-robin tournament. It involved 17 teams, and the champion was Peñarol. This was the last tournament to be played in this federation, having been suspended which would take place the following year. After the dissolution of the Federation, some of the clubs in the FUF returned to the Uruguayan Football Association (AUF) and many others disappeared.

League standings

See also
 1924 Uruguayan Primera División of AUF

Uru
1924 in Uruguayan football
Football competitions in Uruguay